The 2. deild karla is the third tier of men's football in the Icelandic football league system, and the 2007 season was the 42nd edition of the tournament. Haukar won the league, completing the whole season without losing a match, and were subsequently promoted to the 1. deild karla for the 2008 campaign. The second- and third-placed teams, UMF Selfoss and KS/Leiftur, also won promotion. UMF Sindri Höfn finished bottom of the league, having lost all of their away matches, and were relegated to the 3. deild karla.

Clubs

Ten clubs competed in the 2. deild in 2007.  This was the last time the league was played in this format, as it was expanded to 12 teams the following year.

League table

Results grid
Each team played the other nine teams both home and away, resulting in a total of 90 matches.

Top goalscorers

Awards

Player of the year
The 2. deild player of the year for 2007, selected by the KSÍ, was Selfoss striker Sævar Þór Gíslason. He returned to the club in January 2007, having left 10 years previously to join ÍR. Gíslason was the league's top scorer with 20 goals in 18 matches, including a hat-trick against Magni on the final day of the season.

Young player of the year
Ásgeir Þór Ingólfsson, left-midfielder for Haukar, was awarded the young player of the year award for 2007. Aged just 16 at the start of the season, he scored 10 goals from midfield in his debut campaign in senior football. His performances earned him a call up to the national under-19 side in September.

Manager of the year
Ragnar Hauksson, player-manager of KS/Leiftur, was named 2. deild coach of the year for 2007. His team had been predicted to finish seventh in the league before the start of the season, but they exceeded expectations and sealed promotion to the 1. deild with a final-day win against Völsungur. His 10 goals for the club during the 2007 season also led to him being selected in the team of the year.

Team of the year

The KSÍ also selected a team of the year, which included the best 11 players and 5 substitutes.
Goalkeeper
Þorvaldur Þorsteinsson (KS/Leiftur)
Defenders
Arnar Hallsson (ÍR), Þórhallur Dan Jóhannsson (Haukar), Dusan Ivkovic (KS/Leiftur), Sandor Forzis (KS/Leiftur) 
Midfielders
Hilmar Geir Eiðsson (Haukar), Goran Lukic (Haukar), Denis Curic (Höttur), Ásgeir Þór Ingólfsson (Haukar)
Forwards
Sævar Þór Gíslason (Selfoss), Ragnar Hauksson (KS/Leiftur)
Substitutes
Amir Mehica (Haukar), Jón Sveinsson (Selfoss), Kristján Ómar Björnsson (Haukar), Béres Ferenc (KS/Leiftur), Hilmar Rafn Emilsson (Haukar)

References

2. deild karla seasons
Iceland
Iceland
3